"Tithraustes" pyrifera is a moth of the family Notodontidae. It is found in Colombia.

Taxonomy
The species does not belong in Tithraustes, but has not been placed in another genus yet.

References

Moths described in 1911
Notodontidae of South America